Piz Starlex is a mountain in the Sesvenna Range of the Alps, located on the border between Italy and Switzerland. It lies south of Piz Sesvenna.

References

External links
 Piz Starlex on Hikr

Mountains of the Alps
Mountains of Graubünden
Mountains of South Tyrol
Alpine three-thousanders
Italy–Switzerland border
International mountains of Europe
Mountains of Switzerland